Balgowan may refer to:

 Balgowan, South Africa
 Balgowan, South Australia
 Balgowan, Dundee, a suburb of Dundee in Scotland
 Balgowan, Perth and Kinross, a village in Scotland

See also
 Ballygowan (disambiguation)